Iacopo La Rocca (born 17 February 1984) is an Italian-Australian professional footballer & coach, who played as a defensive midfielder or central defender.

Club career
La Rocca started his youth career at Lazio, before moving to his first club Pro Vercelli. He signed 3 years deal with Treviso.

He joined various clubs on loan from Treviso Italy, likes of Chieti, Fermana, Sassari Torres but he was unlucky to got injured every years and than he decided  to moving to Switzerland, where he joined for four yearsAC Bellinzona  where he won the Challenge League and he played the Final Swiss Cup against Basel.
After 4 years in Super League where he played also 6 games in UEFA Cup he joined Swiss Super League club Grasshopper.

On 11 September 2012, he signed a one-year deal with A-League club Western Sydney Wanderers. La Rocca scored his first goal for Western Sydney Wanderers on 18 November 2012 in just his second game, to defeat Perth Glory. In February 2013, he signed a new two-year deal with the Wanderers.

On 23 March, La Rocca was sent off in the last minute of stoppage time in the third Sydney Derby of the season for elbowing Sydney midfielder Terry Antonis in the temple. The subsequent ban meant La Rocca missed the semifinal and the final. His club nonetheless won the title in their debut season.
On 2013 he played the Grand Final he got the man of the match with Broich and won the Joe Marston Medal but Western Sydney Wanderes lost in extra time 2–1 but the year after he won the 2014 AFC Champions League, with La Rocca starting both legs of their triumph over Al-Hilal in the final and became the first Italian to win that trophy.

At the 2014 FIFA Club World Cup in Morocco, La Rocca opened the scoring against Cruz Azul of Mexico in an eventual 1–3 loss after extra time.

In June 2015, La Rocca signed a two-year contract with Adelaide United. After overcoming injury, he featured heavily for Adelaide in the second half of the season and played a crucial role in the central defensive position along with teammate Dylan McGowan in the club's successful attempt at the Premier's Plate and inaugural Championship title.

In November 2016, La Rocca became an Australian citizen, allowing him to be called up to the Australian national team and to be considered as a domestic player for his club.

Melbourne City announced the signing of La Rocca on 15 July 2017 with 2 years deal. La Rocca played is first official game with Melbourne City on 13 September 2017 in FFA Cup against Sydney FC. After his retirement in 2019 he started his coaching career by taking the UEFA B License for coaching in Italy.

Honours

Club
Western Sydney Wanderers
A-League Premiers: 2012–13
AFC Champions League: 2014

Adelaide United FC
 A-League Premiers: 2015–16
 A-League Championship: 2015–16

Individual
Joe Marston Medal: 2014 (shared with Thomas Broich)

References

External links

1984 births
Living people
Footballers from Rome
Italian footballers
Italian expatriate footballers
A-League Men players
Western Sydney Wanderers FC players
S.S. Chieti Calcio players
F.C. Pro Vercelli 1892 players
Adelaide United FC players
Melbourne City FC players
AC Bellinzona players
Grasshopper Club Zürich players
Swiss Super League players
Expatriate footballers in Switzerland
Italian expatriate sportspeople in Switzerland
Expatriate soccer players in Australia
Italian expatriate sportspeople in Australia
Association football midfielders
Naturalised soccer players of Australia
Australian people of Italian descent
S.E.F. Torres 1903 players